Tak Tin Estate is a mixed public/TPS estate in Lam Tin, Kowloon, Hong Kong. It consists of 9 blocks completed in 1991 and 2001. In 1999, some of the flats (Tak Hong House and Tak Yan House excluded) were sold to tenants through Tenants Purchase Scheme Phase 2.

Hong Ying Court is a Home Ownership Scheme court in Lam Tin, near Tak Tin Estate. It has one block built in 1991.

Houses

Tak Tin Estate

Hong Ying Court

Demographics
According to the 2016 by-census, Tak Tin Estate had a population of 15,317. The median age was 53 and the majority of residents (97.8 per cent) were of Chinese ethnicity. The average household size was 2.5 people. The median monthly household income of all households (i.e. including both economically active and inactive households) was HK$22,490.

Politics
For the 2019 District Council election, the estate fell within two constituencies. Most of the estate is located in the Kwong Tak constituency, which is represented by Wilson Or Chong-shing. The remainder falls within the Hing Tin constituency, which is represented by Nelson Ip Tsz-kit.

See also

Public housing estates in Lam Tin

References

Public housing estates in Hong Kong
Tenants Purchase Scheme
Lam Tin
Residential buildings completed in 1991
Residential buildings completed in 2001
1991 establishments in Hong Kong
2001 establishments in Hong Kong